Locketina is a genus of Southeast Asian dwarf spiders that was first described by A. O. Kocak & M. Kemal in 2006.  it contains only three species, found in Indonesia and Malaysia: L. fissivulva, L. pusilla, and L. versa.

See also
 List of Linyphiidae species (I–P)

References

Araneomorphae genera
Linyphiidae
Spiders of Asia